"You're in my Arms (and a million miles away)" is a 1941 song by Vera Lynn, with music by Michael Carr and lyrics by Jack Popplewell. Lynn recorded it with Mantovani and his Orchestra, and a version followed by Anne Shelton with Bert Ambrose and his Orchestra, also in 1941. Leslie Hutchinson (Hutch) recorded the song around this time too.

References

1941 songs
Vera Lynn songs
Songs with music by Michael Carr (composer)